Concert at Newport is a live album by the blues musician John Lee Hooker, recorded at the Newport Folk Festival and released by the Vee-Jay label in 1963.

Reception

AllMusic reviewer Ron Wynn stated: "Arguably his finest live date, this was John Lee Hooker minus the self-congratulatory mugging now an almost mandatory part of his sets. Instead, there's just lean, straight, defiant Hooker vocals and minimal, but effective backing".

Track listing
All compositions credited to John Lee Hooker
 "I Can't Quit You Now Blues" – 2:51
 "Stop Baby Don't Hold Me That Way" – 1:44
 "Tupelo" – 5:17
 "Bus Station Blues" – 3:38
 "Freight Train Be My Friend" – 3:25
 "Boom Boom Boom" – 2:29
 "Talk That Talk Baby" – 1:26
 "Sometimes Baby, You Make Me Feel So Bad" – 3:27
 "You've Got to Walk Yourself" – 4:52
 "Let's Make It" – 2:23
 "The Mighty Fire" – 4:42

Personnel
John Lee Hooker – guitar, vocals
Unidentified musician – bass (tracks 9-11)

References

John Lee Hooker live albums
1964 live albums
Vee-Jay Records live albums